Curtis Dean "Curt" Hanson (August 13, 1943 – June 16, 2017) was an American politician. He was born and raised on a Kossuth County, Iowa farm near Swea City. He was also a resident of Fairfield for fifty-two years. Hanson received his B.A. from the University of Northern Iowa and his M.A. from the University of Iowa. He was a driver education teacher at Fairfield High School for forty-three years, where he received the Fairfield Jaycee Outstanding Young Education Award and was named Fairfield Teacher of the Year Award. Hanson also was president of the Iowa Association of Safety Education and a member of the National Education Society.

Hanson was a member of the Iowa House of Representatives. A Democrat, he served in the Iowa House since 2009 representing the 90th and 82nd Districts.  
On June 16, 2017, he died at the age of 73, from cancer, at his home in Fairfield, Iowa.

References

External links

Representative Kenneth Veenstra official Iowa General Assembly site

1943 births
2017 deaths
Democratic Party members of the Iowa House of Representatives
People from Algona, Iowa
People from Fairfield, Iowa
Educators from Iowa
University of Northern Iowa alumni
University of Iowa alumni
21st-century American politicians
Deaths from cancer in Iowa